Cheongwon County (Cheongwon-gun) was a county in North Chungcheong Province, South Korea. It was dissolved on July 1, 2014 and consolidated to Cheongju.

Cheongwon was twinned with:

  Cangzhou, Hebei, China
  Kikuchi, Kumamoto, Japan

References 

╋
Cheongju
Former subdivisions of South Korea
States and territories disestablished in 2014